The 2003–04 NBA season was the Pacers' 28th season in the National Basketball Association, and 37th season as a franchise. During the offseason, former Pacers head coach Larry Bird was named President of Basketball Operations. One of Bird's first moves in his new position was to fire head coach Isiah Thomas, after Thomas had led the Pacers to first-round playoff exits for three consecutive years. The defensive-minded Rick Carlisle, former head coach of the Detroit Pistons, was announced as Thomas' replacement. Also during the offseason, the Pacers acquired Scot Pollard from the Sacramento Kings in a three-team trade and signed free agent Kenny Anderson.

The Pacers got off to a fast start winning 14 of their first 16 games, and finished the season with a record of 61–21, which was worthy of the Eastern Conference first seed in the playoffs, guaranteed home-court advantage throughout the playoffs for the first time since 2000, and a new all-time franchise-best win–loss record. Jermaine O'Neal was named to the All-NBA Second Team, the first Pacer ever to do so, and even finished third in the MVP voting, which was the highest in the voting any Pacers player had ever reached. Ron Artest was named to the NBA All-Defensive First Team, and also was named Defensive Player of the Year, the first Pacer ever to receive this award. Both O'Neal and Artest were selected for the 2004 NBA All-Star Game, with Carlisle coaching the Eastern Conference. Second-year guard Fred Jones won the Slam Dunk Contest during the All-Star Weekend in Los Angeles.

In the first round of the playoffs, the Pacers swept the 8th-seeded Boston Celtics 4–0. They proceeded to defeat the 4th-seeded Miami Heat 4–2 in the second round, earning the Pacers their sixth spot in the Eastern Conference Finals in 11 years. The Pacers fell 2–4 in the Eastern Conference Finals to the eventual NBA champions, the 3rd-seeded Detroit Pistons, who were coached by former Pacers coach Larry Brown. Following the season, Al Harrington was traded to the Atlanta Hawks, while Anderson went along with him signing as a free agent with the Hawks.

NBA Draft

Roster

Regular season

Season standings

Record vs. opponents

Playoffs

|- align="center" bgcolor="#ccffcc"
| 1
| April 17
| Boston
| W 104–88
| O'Neal, Artest (24)
| Jermaine O'Neal (11)
| Jamaal Tinsley (7)
| Conseco Fieldhouse16,605
| 1–0
|- align="center" bgcolor="#ccffcc"
| 2
| April 20
| Boston
| W 103–90
| Jermaine O'Neal (22)
| Al Harrington (13)
| Reggie Miller (7)
| Conseco Fieldhouse17,347
| 2–0
|- align="center" bgcolor="#ccffcc"
| 3
| April 23
| @ Boston
| W 108–85
| Harrington, Bender (19)
| O'Neal, Foster (7)
| Ron Artest (5)
| FleetCenter17,680
| 3–0
|- align="center" bgcolor="#ccffcc"
| 4
| April 25
| @ Boston
| W 90–75
| Ron Artest (22)
| Foster, Harrington (7)
| Jamaal Tinsley (7)
| FleetCenter16,389
| 4–0
|-

|- align="center" bgcolor="#ccffcc"
| 1
| May 6
| Miami
| W 94–81
| Ron Artest (25)
| Jeff Foster (10)
| Jamaal Tinsley (5)
| Conseco Fieldhouse18,345
| 1–0
|- align="center" bgcolor="#ccffcc"
| 2
| May 8
| Miami
| W 91–80
| Ron Artest (20)
| Harrington, O'Neal (9)
| Jamaal Tinsley (9)
| Conseco Fieldhouse18,345
| 2–0
|- align="center" bgcolor="#ffcccc"
| 3
| May 10
| @ Miami
| L 87–94
| Jermaine O'Neal (29)
| Jermaine O'Neal (9)
| Jamaal Tinsley (5)
| American Airlines Arena20,115
| 2–1
|- align="center" bgcolor="#ffcccc"
| 4
| May 12
| @ Miami
| L 88–100
| Jermaine O'Neal (37)
| Artest, Tinsley (8)
| Jamaal Tinsley (5)
| American Airlines Arena20,128
| 2–2
|- align="center" bgcolor="#ccffcc"
| 5
| May 15
| Miami
| W 94–83
| Jermaine O'Neal (22)
| Jeff Foster (16)
| Jamaal Tinsley (8)
| Conseco Fieldhouse18,345
| 3–2
|- align="center" bgcolor="#ccffcc"
| 6
| May 18
| @ Miami
| W 73–70
| Ron Artest (27)
| Jermaine O'Neal (13)
| Jamaal Tinsley (3)
| American Airlines Arena20,136
| 4–2
|-

|- align="center" bgcolor="#ccffcc"
| 1
| May 22
| Detroit
| W 78–74
| Jermaine O'Neal (21)
| Jermaine O'Neal (14)
| Jamaal Tinsley (5)
| Conseco Fieldhouse18,345
| 1–0
|- align="center" bgcolor="#ffcccc"
| 2
| May 24
| Detroit
| L 67–72
| Reggie Miller (21)
| Jeff Foster (9)
| Anthony Johnson (4)
| Conseco Fieldhouse18,345
| 1–1
|- align="center" bgcolor="#ffcccc"
| 3
| May 26
| @ Detroit
| L 78–85
| Jermaine O'Neal (24)
| Jermaine O'Neal (9)
| Jamaal Tinsley (4)
| The Palace of Auburn Hills22,076
| 1–2
|- align="center" bgcolor="#ccffcc"
| 4
| May 28
| @ Detroit
| W 83–68
| Ron Artest (20)
| Jermaine O'Neal (13)
| Jamaal Tinsley (5)
| The Palace of Auburn Hills22,076
| 2–2
|- align="center" bgcolor="#ffcccc"
| 5
| May 30
| Detroit
| L 65–83
| Artest, Jones (13)
| Ron Artest (11)
| Jamaal Tinsley (5)
| Conseco Fieldhouse18,345
| 2–3
|- align="center" bgcolor="#ffcccc"
| 6
| June 1
| @ Detroit
| L 65–69
| Jermaine O'Neal (20)
| Artest, O'Neal (10)
| Anthony Johnson (7)
| The Palace of Auburn Hills22,076
| 2–4
|-

Player statistics

Season

Playoffs

Player Statistics Citation:

Transactions

Additions

Subtractions

Awards and records
 Ron Artest – NBA Defensive Player of the Year Award, All-NBA Third Team, All-Star Game, NBA All-Defensive First Team
 Rick Carlisle – East All-Star Team Game Head Coach
 Jermaine O'Neal – All-NBA Second Team, All-Star Game

References

Indiana Pacers seasons
Pace
Pace
Indiana